Jean Baptiste Mathey (1630–1696) was a French architect and painter born in Dijon.

Between 1675 and 1694 Mathey enjoyed a remarkable career in which his French planning and devotion to classical rationality (as opposed to the luxuriance of Italian Baroque) were a conscious artistic challenge to established taste. 
Mathey was commissioned by the Archbishop of Prague, Johann Friedrich, to construct the Chateau Troja. His plans were also probably used for the construction of the Church of Saint Roch in the Prague then-suburb of Žižkov.

Rebuilding the Castle of Dux
Count of Waldstein, later the Archbishop of Prague, was apprised with Mathey and brought him to Duchcov for the purpose of rebuilding the Castle of Dux.

1630 births
1696 deaths
Artists from Dijon
17th-century French architects
17th-century French painters
French male painters
Architects from Dijon